Lee Hua-chen (born 14 September 1993), also known as Jasmine Lee, is a Taiwanese former tennis player.

Career
Her career-high WTA rankings are 325 in singles, achieved on 5 August 2019, and 283 in doubles, reached on 22 April 2013.
Lee won ten singles titles and seven doubles titles on the ITF Women's Circuit.

Playing for Chinese Taipei Fed Cup team, she has a win–loss record of 2–0.

ITF Circuit finals

Singles: 17 (10 titles, 7 runner–ups)

Doubles: 14 (7–7)

External links
 
 
 

1993 births
Living people
Taiwanese female tennis players
Sportspeople from Kaohsiung
Universiade medalists in tennis
Universiade bronze medalists for Chinese Taipei
Medalists at the 2013 Summer Universiade
21st-century Taiwanese women
Mississippi State Bulldogs athletes